Acleris hippophaeana is a species of moth of the family Tortricidae. It is found in France, Belgium, Germany, Austria, Switzerland, Italy, Slovakia, Romania, Russia and on Corsica.

The wingspan is 20–22 mm. Adults are on wing from September to April and in July.

The larvae feed on Hippophae rhamnoides. Larvae can be found in June and from August to September.

References

	

Moths described in 1865
Taxa named by Carl von Heyden
hippophaeana
Moths of Europe